The Ernad Express is an Express train run by the Southern Railway zone of the Indian Railways between Mangalore Central railway station in Karnataka and Nagercoil Junction railway station in Tamil Nadu.

Train number 16605 runs from Mangalore to Nagercoil and on the return journey, the train number 16606 runs from Nagercoil to Mangalore.

Traction
As the route is fully electrified. It is hauled by WAP-4 from Electric Loco Shed, Erode or Royapuram shed.

References

External links

Transport in Mangalore
Transport in Nagercoil
Named passenger trains of India
Rail transport in Kerala
Rail transport in Tamil Nadu
Rail transport in Karnataka
Railway services introduced in 2009
2009 establishments in India
Express trains in India